Sparekassen for Hjørring By og Omegn (lit. "Savings Bank for Hjørring Town and Surroundings") was a savings bank based in Hjørring, Denmark. It was founded on 11 September 1844. The head office was located at Østergade 8.

Legacy
The Bull's Well (Danish: Tyrebrønden) in front of Amtmandsboligen on Brinck Seidelinsgade in Hjørring was donated to Hjørring Municipality by Sparekassen for Hjørring By og Omegn on 26 May 1950 to mark the bank's 100 year anniversary in 1944. It was created by Jan Buhl and unveiled in 1961.

Further reading

 Glerup, Ejnar: Sparekassen for Hjørring By og Omegn : 1844 - 11. September 1944 : et Jubilæumsskrift, 1944 (106 pages)

References 

Defunct banks of Denmark
Defunct companies based in Hjørring Municipality
Danish companies established in 1844